Chris Bratton may refer to:

Christopher Bratton, former president of School of the Museum of Fine Arts, Boston
Chris Bratton (drummer) (born 1969), American drummer involved in the hardcore punk scene